The 1950–51 Washington Huskies men's basketball team represented the University of Washington for the  NCAA college basketball season. Led by first-year head coach Tippy Dye, the Huskies were members of the Pacific Coast Conference and played their home games on campus at Hec Edmundson Pavilion in Seattle, Washington.

In the 16-team NCAA tournament, Washington defeated Texas A&M by 22 points in the opener of the West regional in   then fell by four to second-ranked  In the regional third place game, the Huskies defeated newly-crowned NIT champion BYU by thirteen points to end the season 

Dye was hired in June 1950; he was previously the head coach at  The Buckeyes were Big Ten champions in the  season and made the eight-team NCAA tournament.

Washington returned to the NCAA Tournament two years later in 1953, and advanced to the Final Four.

Postseason results

|-
!colspan=6 style=| Pacific Coast Conference Playoff Series

|-
!colspan=6 style=| NCAA Tournament

Rankings

References

External links
Sports Reference – Washington Huskies: 1950–51 basketball season

Washington Huskies men's basketball seasons
Washington Huskies
Washington
Washington